Gliese 1002 b is a potentially habitable exoplanet located 16 light years away, in the constellation of Cetus. It is one of the potentially habitable planets closest to Earth. The planet, which has an Earth SImilarity Index of 86%, is in the habitable zone of its parent star. Gliese 1002 b has an estimated mass of 1.08 Earth masses, 1.03 times the radius of Earth, an orbital period of 10.3 days, and a surface temperature of 261 Kelvin.

The star, Gliese 1002, is a quiet red dwarf not believed to release flares that could harm the atmosphere.

References 

Cetus (constellation)
Exoplanets discovered in 2022
Exoplanets detected by radial velocity